Enoli Norverto Paredes (born September 28, 1995) is a Dominican professional baseball pitcher for the Houston Astros of Major League Baseball (MLB). He made his MLB debut in 2020.

Career
On December 3, 2014, Paredes signed with the Houston Astros as an international free agent. He made his professional debut with the GCL Astros in 2016, going 1–3 with a 3.74 ERA over  innings. He appeared in 8 games for the Quad Cities River Bandits in 2017, going 1–3 with a 2.11 ERA over 38 innings. He missed the second half of 2017 with an elbow injury. He split the 2018 season between Quad Cities and the Buies Creek Astros, going a combined 6–4 with a 1.43 ERA over  innings. He split the 2019 season between the Fayetteville Woodpeckers and the Corpus Christi Hooks, going a combined 5–4 with a 2.78 ERA over 94 innings.  

Paredes was added to the Astros 40–man roster following the 2019 season.

On July 24, 2020, Paredes made his MLB debut against the Seattle Mariners, pitching one scoreless inning. In 2020 he was 3-3 with a 3.05 ERA in 22 relief appearances in which he pitched 20.2 innings. Paredes made his postseason debut against the Oakland Athletics in the 2020 American League Division Series. 

Paredes was optioned to the Triple-A Sugar Land Space Cowboys to begin the 2023 season.

Personal life
Enoli's father was a rookie league outfielder with the Montreal Expos.

See also

 List of Major League Baseball players from the Dominican Republic

References

External links

1995 births
Living people
Buies Creek Astros players
Corpus Christi Hooks players
Dominican Republic expatriate baseball players in the United States
Fayetteville Woodpeckers players
Gulf Coast Astros players
Houston Astros players
Major League Baseball players from the Dominican Republic
Major League Baseball pitchers
People from Samaná Province
Quad Cities River Bandits players
Sugar Land Skeeters players
Sugar Land Space Cowboys players